The 2018 Indiana Hoosiers men's soccer team represented Indiana University Bloomington in men's college soccer during the 2018 NCAA Division I men's soccer season and 2018 Big Ten Conference men's soccer season. It was the 46th season the university fielded a men's varsity soccer program, and the 28th season the program played in the Big Ten Conference.

During the regular season Indiana completed the league double by winning both the Big Ten regular season, and the 2018 Big Ten Conference Men's Soccer Tournament. The Hoosiers were seeded second overall in the 2018 NCAA Division I Men's Soccer Tournament, where they reached the College Cup before losing to eventual national champions, and fellow Big Ten side, Maryland.

Indiana defender, Andrew Gutman, was named the winner of the Hermann Trophy, the top individual award a men's college soccer player can earn.

Background 

Long time assistant coach, Brian Maisonneuve, left Indiana to take the head coaching position at Ohio State. Former Indiana standout, Danny O'Rourke was hired as an assistant.

Player movement

Departures

Transfers

Recruits

Squad information

Roster

Coaching staff 
{|class="wikitable"
|-
! style="" scope="col" colspan="2"|Front office
|-

|-
! style="" scope="col" colspan="2"|Coaching staff
|-

Schedule 

|-
!colspan=6 style=""| Regular season

|-
!colspan=6 style=""| Big Ten Tournament
|-

|-
!colspan=6 style=""| NCAA Tournament
|-

Statistics

Appearances and goals

|-
! colspan=12 style="" text-align:center| Goalkeepers

|-
! colspan=12 style="" text-align:center| Defenders

|-
! colspan=12 style="" text-align:center| Midfielders

|-
! colspan=12 style="" text-align:center| Forwards

|-

Awards

References

External links 
 IU Men's Soccer
 IU 2018 Men's Soccer Schedule

2018
2018 Big Ten Conference men's soccer season
2018 NCAA Division I Men's Soccer Tournament participants
2018 Indiana
American men's college soccer teams 2018 season
2018 in sports in Indiana
2018